Juan Valenzuela Velázquez (24 June 1574 – 2 February 1645) was a Roman Catholic prelate who served as Bishop of Salamanca (1642–1645).

Biography
Juan Valenzuela Velázquez was born in Cuenca, Spain on 24 June 1574.
On 24 March 1642, he was appointed during the papacy of Pope Urban VIII as Bishop of Salamanca.
On 27 July 1642, he was consecrated bishop by Martín Carrillo Alderete, Archbishop of Granada, with Juan Queipo de Llano y Valdés, Bishop of Guadix, and Blas Tineo Palacios, Titular Bishop of Thermopylae, serving as co-consecrators. 
He served as Bishop of Salamanca until his death on 2 February 1645.

References 

17th-century Roman Catholic bishops in Spain
Bishops appointed by Pope Urban VIII
1574 births
1645 deaths